Useriner See is a lake in the Mecklenburgische Seenplatte district in Mecklenburg-Vorpommern, Germany. At an elevation of 59.4 m, its surface area is 3.6 km².

Lakes of Mecklenburg-Western Pomerania